Dr. Bruce Grube was the eleventh President of Georgia Southern University, which is a Georgia Regional University located in Statesboro, Georgia, United States. He was president of the university from July 1, 1999, until December 31, 2009.

Grube has also served on the NCAA Executive Committee, as Chair of the NCAA Division I Presidential Advisory Group, and as Chair of the Council of Presidents of the Southern Conference.

References
 Georgia Southern President Bruce Grube To Step Down In June ‘09. Georgia Southern University, November 24, 2008. Accessed 2011-02-24.

Heads of universities and colleges in the United States
Georgia Southern University
Year of birth missing (living people)
Living people